Oedipus the King is a 1968 British film adaptation of the Sophoclean tragedy Oedipus Rex, directed and co-written by Philip Saville. It stars Christopher Plummer as the title character, Orson Welles as Tiresias, Lilli Palmer as Jocasta, Richard Johnson as Creon and Donald Sutherland as the leading member of the Chorus, though the latter's voice was dubbed by Valentine Dyall. Saville's first theatrical film effort, the film remained highly theatrical in nature, and is known for its intensive dialogue typical of an ancient play.

Plot 
The film is a largely faithful adaptation of the original text, with a screenplay based on Paul Roche's translation directly from the Greek published in the early 1950s. However, the film went a step further than the play, by actually showing, in flashback, the murder of King Laius. It also showed Oedipus and Jocasta in bed together, making love.

Cast

Production

Filming of Oedipus the King began in August 1967, on-location in Epirus, Greece, in the municipality of Ioannina. Much of the film was shot in an ancient amphitheater, since converted into an archeological site, at Dodoni. 

Many of the cast members were from the Royal Shakespeare Company.Theoni V. Aldredge (credited as 'Deni Vachlioti') was the costume designer.

Reception 
The film was released in the United Kingdom in June 1968, by Rank Film Distributors. It was not seen in Europe and the U.S. until the 1970s and '80s, after legal release and distribution rights were granted to video and TV, and was considered a rare film.

Critical response 
Despite its calibre of actors, the film was not universally well received. New York Magazine described it as "almost comical" in a September 1968 review; a 1972 review said "An elaborate production, overly academic and without much force or cinematic merit." Leonard Maltin in 2006 said that the "film version of Sophocles play is OK for students who have a test on it the next day, but others won't appreciate this version."

However, in 1968 the Illustrated London News praised its "cinematic fluidity" and Jon Solomon in 2001 said that the film was "distinguished by intensity and fine acting", with Plummer's Oedipus boasting "an arrogant, strong-willed title character". However, Solomon also remarked that the film "would never have won first prize at an ancient Athenian contest.

References

External links
 
 

1968 films
1960s historical films
1960s English-language films
1960s British films
1960s fantasy films
British films based on plays
British historical drama films
British fantasy drama films
Films based on ancient Greek plays
Films based on classical mythology
Films based on works by Sophocles
Films directed by Philip Saville
Films shot in Epirus
Incest in film
Patricide in fiction
Works based on Oedipus Rex